Marine Corps Logistics Command (MARCORLOGCOM) is a major command of the United States Marine Corps responsible for support for fielded weapons systems and support services and supplies.

Mission
To provide worldwide, integrated logistics/supply chain and distribution management; depot level maintenance management; and strategic prepositioning capability in support of the operating forces and other supported units to maximize their readiness and sustainability and to support enterprise and program level Total Life Cycle Management.

Subordinate commands
 Blount Island Command (Blount Island, Jacksonville, Florida)
 Marine Corps Depot Maintenance Command (Marine Corps Logistics Base Albany, Albany, Georgia)
 Production Plant Albany (MCLB Albany, Albany, Georgia)
 Production Plant Barstow (MCLB Barstow, Barstow, California)
Marine Force Storage Command (Marine Corps Logistics Base Albany, Albany, Georgia)

See also
 List of United States Marine Corps installations
United States Army Materiel Command
Naval Supply Systems Command (U.S. Navy)
Air Force Materiel Command (U.S. Air Force)

References

External links
 

Logistics of the United States Marine Corps
Commands of the United States Marine Corps
Military units and formations established in 2003